Paulatuk (Nora Aliqatchialuk Ruben) Airport  is located near Paulatuk, Northwest Territories, Canada. Nav Canada reports that subsidence, turbulence and cross-winds may be encountered when landing here.

The airport is named for Nora Aliqatchialuk Ruben who was the first ticket agent at the airport. As of March 2011 it was the only Canadian airport to be named after a woman.

Airlines and destinations

See also
Paulatuk Water Aerodrome

References

External links

Airports in the Arctic
Certified airports in the Inuvik Region